Brian McMahon is a former Irish sportsperson. He played hurling with the Dublin senior inter-county team and won an All Star award in 1990, being picked in the full forward position. He is widely known as the best hurler to come from the east of Ireland.

References

External links
 GAA Info Profile

Living people
Dublin inter-county hurlers
Year of birth missing (living people)
Crumlin hurlers